The 2014 Mountain Province Bus accident was a bus accident that occurred when a Florida Trans bus fell off a road in Sitio Paggang, Talubin, Bontoc, Mountain Province of the Philippines. The accident occurred on February 7, 2014. Fourteen people were killed and more than 32 people were injured. Comedian Tado and two more artists died in this accident.

Accident
The accident occurred in Barangay Talubin, Bontoc, Mountain Province at around 7:20 am   The bus was traveling on the Mountain Province when it fell 100 to 120 meters deep off the mountain.

As a result, 14 people were killed and 32 were left injured. Two foreigners, a Dutch and a Canadian national, were among the casualties. Visual artist Gerard Baja, musician David Sicam, and comedian Tado were also killed in the accident. Those who sustained injuries were brought to the Bontoc General Hospital. The driver was among those injured while the bus conductor was killed.

The passenger bus involved was a DMMC Aero Adamant with body no. 206 and is mounted on Hino RF821 chassis.

Investigation
Mountain Province Senior Superintendent police chief Oliver Emmodias said mechanical problems and a defect in the vehicle could have been the cause of the accident.

Aftermath

Sanctions
The Land Transportation Franchising Regulatory Board (LTFRB) imposed a 30-day preventive suspension to GV Florida Transport 186 of its franchised units on February 10, 2014. The Court of Appeals lifted the suspension on June 2014, citing grave abuse of discretion from the LTFRB, which found no "violations or willful and contumacious refusal to comply with the rules or regulations" but suspended the bus company anyway; on the same decision, the court affirmed the cancellation of certificates of public convenience to 10 other Florida buses.

Commemoration
On July 6, 2014, an artwork called "Every Bus is a Bus Full of Dreamers" was painted in front of the Sampaloc GV Florida Transport terminal.

References

Bus incidents in the Philippines
History of Mountain Province
2014 in the Philippines
2014 disasters in the Philippines